Zhivko is a Bulgarian masculine given name. The Serbo-Croatian variant of the same name is Živko.

It may refer to:

 Zhivko Atanasov (born 1991), Bulgarian footballer
 Zhivko Boyadzhiev (born 1976), Bulgarian footballer
 Zhivko Dinev (born 1987), Bulgarian footballer
 Zhivko Gospodinov (born 1957), Bulgarian footballer
 Zhivko Milanov (born 1984), Bulgarian footballer
 Zhivko Vangelov (born 1960), Bulgarian wrestler
 Zhivko Videnov (born 1977), Bulgarian hurdler
 Zhivko Zhelev (born 1979), Bulgarian footballer

Slavic masculine given names
Bulgarian masculine given names